Sporting Clube de Goa, simply known as Sporting Goa (also known by its abbreviation SCG), is an Indian professional football club based in Panaji, in the Indian state of Goa, that competes in Goa Professional League. The club has also competed in the I-League, then top flight of Indian football league system. It is built on the lines of Portuguese club Sporting CP and adopting a similar club crest. Its Futsal section competes in the Futsal Club Championship, top tier futsal club competition of the country.

The club Cidade de Goa (City of Goa) was purchased by Sporting's owner late Mr Peter Vaz and wife current President Mrs Natalina Vaz and renamed Sporting Clube de Goa in 1999. Sporting Clube de Goa won its first Goa Professional League in 2006. Since then it has clinched the title in 2014, 2016, 2018, 2020 and 2021.
Sporting Goa is the only club to have won the Super Cup, without winning the league or Federation Cup.

Sporting Clube de Goa pulled out of 2016–17 I-League, citing AIFF bias against some clubs.

History

1999–2010
Sporting Clube de Goa, as a professional football club, came into existence in 1999, when the public of Panjim decided to launch football club, after Cidade de Goa disbanded its football team. Thus, after Vasco Sports Club, Sporting became the second club of public shareholding in Goa. The club, built on the lines of Portuguese club Sporting Clube de Portugal, has made rapid strides in the national circuit. Sporting shot to prominence by an impressive performance in the 2001–02 Federation Cup, the team made it to the last four after victories over stronger teams like East Bengal FC and Indian Bank Recreational Club.

After winning the 2002–03 National Football League II, Sporting made its debut in the 2003–04 season of National Football League.

In 2004–05 NFL season, they were on the verge of winning their first league championship but lost out on the last day when Dempo pipped them to the title. Their season was marred by a horrific bus accident that ruled out 4 key players for the whole season, while several others were injured. However, led by Nigerian import Dudu Omagbemi, they managed to complete their matches in a very short span of time after being given a few weeks off so that their players could recover, and heroically came second ahead of traditional powerhouses East Bengal, Mohun Bagan, Salgaocar and Mahindra United. Sporting entered into the finals of 2005 Federation Cup, but finished as the runner-up.

In 2005, Sporting missed the Durand Cup title by a whisker when the Army XI produced an upset to win. In the 2006 edition of Federation Cup, they reached the finals once again, but lost in penalty shoot-out to Mohun Bagan AC. They achieved third place in the 2008–09 I-League.

2010–present
After getting relegated from the I-League in 2010, they participated in the 2011 I-League 2nd Division and won promotion by finishing in 2nd place. In the finals of 2013–14 Indian Federation Cup, Churchill Brothers defeated Sporting Goa 3–1. In June 2020, Sporting Goa enjoyed an international transfer when club's Indian forward Shanon Viegas signed with Portuguese AF Lisboa 2ª Divisão Série side C.D. Olivais e Moscavide for a long-term deal.

In the 2020–21 Goa Professional League, Sporting Clube de Goa emerged champions after recording a comprehensive 9–0 win over Guardian Angel in the final league match at Chowgule ground, but was not selected for I-League Second Division. Their futsal section won GFA State Futsal Championship, earning the place in AIFF Futsal Club Championship.

In the 2021–22 season, Sporting Goa finished as runners-up, finishing behind Dempo. In August 2022, legendary Goan manager Armando Colaco was appointed as new head coach by the club on a three-year deal.

Crest & colours
The sporting crest is supposed to be almost an exact replica of the Sporting CP, but not completely. One notable difference is that on Sporting Portugal's crest it says "Sporting Portugal", while Sporting Goa's does not. Another difference is that Sporting Portugal's crest is coloured in mostly dark green and yellow, while the Sporting Goa crest is darkish green and white.

While the crest of Sporting Goa is coloured in green and white, the official club colours are orange and white. The club's nickname is Flaming Orange.

Ownership
The club was modelled on the Portuguese giants Sporting Clube de Portugal and have adopted a similar club crest. The club was founded as Cidade de Goa, was taken over by entrepreneurs Peter Vaz and Edgar Afonso. Later they renamed it as Sporting Clube de Goa in 1999.

Stadium

Traditionally, Sporting Goa have played at the Fatorda Stadium in Margao, Goa. During the 2011 I-League 2nd Division. However, they had to play at Jawaharlal Nehru Stadium in Shillong as the league does not host matches in home and away format. As SC Goa were back in the top-tier of the I-League, they had again started to play their home games at Fatorda Stadium.

Goa Football Association owned Duler Stadium in Mapusa, became the home ground of Sporting during the 2012–13 I-League, alongside Tilak Maidan Stadium (from the end of January). They also used Duler during the 2013–14 I-League and Goa Professional League. In Goa, it became the second stadium to get AstroTurf since 2006.

Rivalries
In the land of Portuguese heritage, Sporting Clube de Goa has rivalries with their fellow Goan sides; Dempo, Churchill Brothers and Salgaocar, whom they faced in I-League and face in Goa Professional League. The club previously had a rivalry with another Goan side Pax of Nagoa.

Academy and infrastructure
On 16 August 2013, Sporting launched their own football academy on the occasion of the 198th anniversary of founding of Don Bosco. The academy for various age groups, namely U-10, U-12, U-14, U-16, U-18 and U-20, with the coaching team built around Spanish coach Javier Fernández,  assisted by Norbert Gonsalves, Ashwin Crasto, Francisco Raposo and Freddy Gomes. They worked under the overall supervision and guidance of Sporting's then head coach Oscar Bruzon, in order to implement the Sporting Clube de Goa youth development plan. Sporting Goa also renovated the football ground at Don Bosco College in Panaji with the installation of sub-surface slit drainage combined with the laying of perforated pipes. The original mud topping has given way to a sand-based top layer, which encourages drainage and healthy grass growth, and provides a level and cushioned playing surface.

Honours
 Youth League U18
Champions (1): 2010

Kit manufacturers and shirt sponsors

In the community

Sporting Clube de Goa launched its mascot named "Zumba", besides its theme song "Flaming Orange", composed by one of Goa's leading bands, Sky High With Pomp.

Players

First-team players

Honours

League
 I-League
Runners-up (1): 2004–05
Third place (1): 2008–09
National Football League II
Champions (1): 2002–03
 I-League 2nd Division
Runners-up (1): 2011
 Goa Professional League
Winners (6): 2006–07, 2013–14, 2015–16, 2017–18, 2019–20 (shared), 2020–21
Runners-up (2): 2016–17, 2021–22
 I-League U19
Winners (1): 2010
 Goa Futsal Championship
Winners (1): 2021

Cup
 Federation Cup
Runners-up (3): 2005, 2006, 2013–14
 Indian Super Cup
Champions (1): 2005
Durand Cup
Runners-up (1): 2005
Goa Governor's Cup
Champions (2): 2005, 2007–08
Runners-up (1): 2003
Goa Police Cup
Champions (1): 2018
Runners-up (3): 2005, 2010, 2019

Others
AWES Cup
Champions (1): 2018
 Guru Gobind Singh Trophy
Runners-up (1): 2000

Managerial history

  Alex Alvares (—2007)
  Clifford Chukwuma (2007—2009)
  Roy Barreto  (2009)
  Vishwas Gaonkar (2009)
  Ekendra Singh (2010—2012)
  Óscar Bruzón (2012—2014)
  Mateus Costa (2014—2019)
  Francisco Vaz (2019—2022)
  Armando Colaco (2022—present)

Notable players
For all current and former notable players of Sporting Clube de Goa with a Wikipedia article, see: Sporting Clube de Goa players.

World Cup players
  Anthony Wolfe (2013–2014)
  Densill Theobald (2015–2016)

Average attendances

See also
 List of Goan State Football Champions
 List of football clubs in Goa

Notes

References

Further reading

External links
Club official page at Facebook
Sporting Clube de Goa at the-aiff.com
Sporting Clube de Goa team profile and statistics at Global Sports Archive
Sporting Clube de Goa at Sofascore
News on SCG at Goal.com

 
Association football clubs established in 1999
Football clubs in Goa
I-League clubs
I-League 2nd Division clubs
1999 establishments in Goa